Waimana is a rural valley in the Whakatāne District and Bay of Plenty Region of New Zealand's North Island. It is located in the northern Te Urewera. Waimana River, originally known as Tauranga River, runs through the valley, joining the Ohinemataroa River one kilometre south-west of Tāneatua.

History and culture

European settlement

The Waimana settlement is based around a wide, straight main road, dating back to its heyday before motor vehicles were introduced and goods roads were opened to other towns.

The Waimana-Nukuhou North Memorial Hall was opened on the main road in 1953. A plaque above the fireplace in the hall lists two local men who died in World War I and 17 local men in World War II. A display board near the fireplace names the 12 local men who served in World War I, the 74 local men in served in World War II, and the 36 ex-servicemen who moved to the district after 1945.

A framed bronze plaque was erected at the entrance to the hall in 1964, commemorating "the original pioneers of the Waimana settlement from 2nd Sept 1907 to 28th Sept 1909" with a list of 27 names.

The Waimana Gorge Road was partially closed in early July 2019 after part of the road was blocked by a slip. It was completely closed in early August due to heavy rain. The slip was cleared and the road was fully reopened later that month.

Marae

The valley is the rohe (tribal area) of the Tuhoe people. It has several marae:

 Piripari Marae and Tamaikaimoana meeting house, affiliated with Tamakaimoana and Ngāi Tātua, established in 1962
 Pouahinau Marae and Tūranga Pikitoi meeting house, affiliated with Tūranga Pikitoi, established in 1933 
 Rāhiri Marae and Rāhiri ō te Rangi meeting house, affiliated with Ngāti Rere, established between 1875 and 1880
 Raroa Marae and Te Poho ō Tānemoeahi meeting house, affiliated with Ko Tamaruarangi, established in 1925
 Tanatana Marae and Te Poho ō Tuhoe meeting house, affiliated with Ngāti Rere, established in 1919
 Tataiāhape Marae and Takutai ō Terangi meeting house, affiliated with Ngāti Raka, established in 1906
 Tauanui Marae and Te Poho ō Tamatea meeting house, affiliated with Whakatāne Hapū, established in 1933
 Tāwhana Marae and Ngā Tau E Maha meeting house, affiliated with Ngā Maihi, established in 1935

In October 2020, the Government committed $508,757 from the Provincial Growth Fund to upgrade Tataiāhape Marae, Piripari Marae, Matahi Marae and Tanatana Marae. It also committed $622,833 to upgrade Raroa Marae and two other marae.

Demographics
The SA1 area is part of the Waingarara-Waimana statistical area.

The SA1 area had a population of 195 at the 2018 New Zealand census, a decrease of 6 people (−3.0%) since the 2013 census, and an increase of 24 people (14.0%) since the 2006 census. There were 57 households, comprising 87 males and 111 females, giving a sex ratio of 0.78 males per female. The median age was 24.8 years (compared with 37.4 years nationally), with 69 people (35.4%) aged under 15 years, 39 (20.0%) aged 15 to 29, 78 (40.0%) aged 30 to 64, and 9 (4.6%) aged 65 or older.

Ethnicities were 33.8% European/Pākehā, 80.0% Māori, 3.1% Pacific peoples, 1.5% Asian, and 1.5% other ethnicities. People may identify with more than one ethnicity.

Although some people chose not to answer the census's question about religious affiliation, 40.0% had no religion, 24.6% were Christian, and 18.5% had Māori religious beliefs.

Of those at least 15 years old, 12 (9.5%) people had a bachelor's or higher degree, and 24 (19.0%) people had no formal qualifications. The median income was $24,500, compared with $31,800 nationally. 9 people (7.1%) earned over $70,000 compared to 17.2% nationally. The employment status of those at least 15 was that 54 (42.9%) people were employed full-time, 21 (16.7%) were part-time, and 15 (11.9%) were unemployed.

Waingarara-Waimana statistical area

Waingarara-Waimana had a population of 2,361 at the 2018 New Zealand census, an increase of 105 people (4.7%) since the 2013 census, and an increase of 165 people (7.5%) since the 2006 census. There were 651 households, comprising 1,185 males and 1,179 females, giving a sex ratio of 1.01 males per female. The median age was 30.8 years (compared with 37.4 years nationally), with 711 people (30.1%) aged under 15 years, 450 (19.1%) aged 15 to 29, 951 (40.3%) aged 30 to 64, and 252 (10.7%) aged 65 or older.

Ethnicities were 36.6% European/Pākehā, 75.2% Māori, 4.7% Pacific peoples, 0.8% Asian, and 0.9% other ethnicities. People may identify with more than one ethnicity.

The percentage of people born overseas was 4.6, compared with 27.1% nationally.

Although some people chose not to answer the census's question about religious affiliation, 40.3% had no religion, 23.4% were Christian, 28.7% had Māori religious beliefs and 1.1% had other religions.

Of those at least 15 years old, 222 (13.5%) people had a bachelor's or higher degree, and 336 (20.4%) people had no formal qualifications. The median income was $21,200, compared with $31,800 nationally. 108 people (6.5%) earned over $70,000 compared to 17.2% nationally. The employment status of those at least 15 was that 693 (42.0%) people were employed full-time, 237 (14.4%) were part-time, and 144 (8.7%) were unemployed.

Education

The school opened in 1908.

It also opened in 1908.

References

Whakatane District
Populated places in the Bay of Plenty Region
Valleys of New Zealand